Sholem Aleichem is a crater on Mercury, named after the Yiddish writer Sholem Aleichem. The inter-crater plain deposits have been deformed by linear ridges.

Adjacent to the Sholem Aleichem crater to the southeast is the older and larger Vyāsa crater. Further to the east is Stravinsky crater. To the south and southeast are the similarly sized Al-Hamadhani crater and Scarlatti crater. To the west are To Ngoc Van crater and Bruegel crater.  To the northwest is Al-Akhtal crater.

Hollows

References

Impact craters on Mercury